Radini Nayau is the courtesy title given to the wife or chief wife of the Tu'i Nayau, Chief of the Lau Islands in Fiji. The bearer of title is installed at the same time as the Tui Nayau. In the past when polygamy was the norm and the Tui Nayau had many wives, the chief or senior wife bore this title.

The first holder of the title is likely to have been Laufitu, the senior wife of Rasolo, the first installed Tui Nayau. The last holder of this title was Ro Lady Lala Mara.

The following table lists consorts of Tui Nayaus who have held the title.

Fijian chiefesses